Malcolm McQueen Gillespie Clarke (29 June 1944 – January 2004) was a Scottish professional footballer who played as a midfielder in the English Football League.

Career
After playing junior football in his native Scotland for Johnstone Burgh, Clarke played in the English Football League for Leicester City, Cardiff City, Bristol City and Hartlepool United. He later played in Australia for APIA Leichhardt and Inter Monaro.

References

1944 births
2004 deaths
Sportspeople from Clydebank
Footballers from West Dunbartonshire
Association football midfielders
Scottish footballers
Johnstone Burgh F.C. players
Leicester City F.C. players
Cardiff City F.C. players
Bristol City F.C. players
Hartlepool United F.C. players
APIA Leichhardt FC players
Scottish Junior Football Association players
English Football League players
Scottish expatriate footballers
Expatriate soccer players in Australia
Scottish expatriate sportspeople in Australia